Mike or Michael McKenzie or MacKenzie may refer to:

 Michael MacKenzie (cricketer) (born 1974), New Zealand cricketer
 Michael Mackenzie (filmmaker), Canadian theatre director, film director, screenwriter, and dramaturge
 Michael MacKenzie (rugby union) (born 1983), Namibian rugby union prop
 Michael McKenzie (swimmer) (born 1967), Australian long-distance freestyle swimmer
 Michael McKenzie (artist) (born 1953), American author and artist
 Michael McKenzie (curler), Scottish wheelchair curler
 Mike MacKenzie (politician) (born 1958), Scottish National Party Politician
 Mike McKenzie (American football) (born 1976), American football cornerback
 Mike McKenzie (ice hockey) (born 1986), Canadian professional ice hockey player
 Mike McKenzie (jazz musician) (1922–1999), Guyanese jazz musician
 Mike McKenzie (singer/songwriter), Scottish musician
 Mike "Gunface" McKenzie (born 1980), American musician with The Red Chord

Characters
 Macca MacKenzie or Michael MacKenzie, a fictional character on Australian soap opera Home and Away